Lepinotus reticulatus, known generally as the reticulate-winged trogiid or reticulate-winged booklouse, is a species of granary booklouse in the family Trogiidae. It is found in Africa, Australia, Europe and Northern Asia (excluding China), Central America, North America, Oceania, South America, and Southern Asia.

References

External links

 

Trogiidae
Articles created by Qbugbot
Insects described in 1905